The Little River is a perennial stream of the Port Phillip catchment, located in the Greater Metropolitan Melbourne region of Victoria, Australia. It was also known as Cocoroc Rivulet.

Course and features
The Little River rises in the Brisbane Ranges, near  and flows generally east through the Werribee Plain, joined by three minor tributaries, before reaching its mouth at Port Phillip, north of Beacon Point near the boundary between the City of Greater Geelong and the City of Wyndham. The river descends  over its  course.

Etymology
The traditional Aboriginal name of the river is Diabagnorite or Worrin-yaloke.

See also

 List of rivers of Australia
 Little River Band
 Werribee and Avalon Important Bird Area

References

External links

Melbourne Water catchment
Rivers of Barwon South West (region)
Rivers of Grampians (region)
Rivers of Greater Melbourne (region)
Geography of Melbourne
Coastline of Victoria (Australia)